The International Coalition of Library Consortia (ICOLC) is an informal, self-organized group of library consortia from around the world; it exists for strategic and practical discussion of issues of common interest among the consortia members. The ICOLC first met informally as the Consortium of Consortia (COC) in 1997. Over time, its name was adjusted to reflect its increasingly global character.

A library consortium is any local, regional, or national cooperative association of libraries that provides for the systematic and effective coordination of the resources of school, public, academic, and special libraries and information centers, for improving services to the clientele of such libraries. Consortia conduct their business to advance research and learning, share risk, provide easy access to information, provide high-quality content (electronic resources), enable continuous professional development, strengthen library leadership as education and information providers, and to shape the future.

All library consortia, anywhere in the world, may be part of the ICOLC. There are no membership fees or barriers to participation. The ICOLC gathers its strength from sharing information and strategies about the benefits that its members bring to libraries and their users. These benefits can include:

 Cost reduction through group purchasing;
 Greater ability to advocate for library needs;
 Improving expertise through professional development programs for library staff;
 Encouraging resource sharing (content, technology, expertise, and funding);
 Creating opportunities for joint advocacy, marketing, and fundraising for libraries; and
 Undertaking special initiatives for the group, such as digitization, technology implementation, information sharing, or creation of a union catalog.

Members

ICOLC represents both formally organized and informal consortia. That is, consortial groups range from informal with no central office, a rotating leadership, and volunteer service; the most formal may be legally incorporated, have an organized office in a larger government agency or NGO, with large permanent staff. Consortia may adjust and change over time: a hallmark of cooperative work.

Consortia can come in many different shapes and sizes—comprising dozens even to hundreds of libraries down to groups of a handful. Some have broad programs that bring libraries together, while many are mainly brought together to license electronic resources for common use. Consortia not only vary in size, but they are also very diverse. Consortia vary in terms of mission, scope, funding sources, total funding, staffing, and more. ICOLC's member consortia may be confined to specific library types (e.g., special libraries, academic libraries, public libraries) or government agencies, or can comprise multi-type libraries, which may be regional or cover broad regions, nation, or more. Many libraries belong to more than one, to achieve different purposes.

Operations

The ICOLC serves participating organizations by facilitating discussion among consortia on issues of common interest. It conducts meetings that rotate in locations around the world. The closed session/invitational meetings happen twice a year (North American venue in spring; European venue in fall) to keep consortia informed about new e-resources, pricing practices of information providers and vendors, and other issues of importance to directors, governing boards, and library members. During these meetings, ICOLC may meet with selected information providers, to discuss their offerings and to engage in dialog about issues of mutual concern. But the primary purpose of the meetings is information exchange and discussion across the consortia.

In particular, the ICOLC has distinguished itself with important public statements about key common issues, meant for wide distribution in order to advance discussion with partners, suppliers, and publishers—and to communicate expertise. Of special significance and impact have been the 2004 ICOLC Statement of Current Perspective and its widely disseminated and discussed successor statements of January 2009 and June 2010 These received wide play in the media and were the topics of a great deal of conversation throughout the consortial and scholarly communications industries.

Proposals for statements ICOLC may issue come from within the ICOLC membership (in meetings, via e-mail); they gather support from members and take shape when a small working group is assigned to draft a statement. All ICOLC members are invited to review the drafts online and suggest changes, with iterated revision by a stated deadline. After there is a consensus via endorsements, the Statement is posted on the ICOLC web site and disseminated through a variety of media.

All library consortia anywhere in the world are welcome to participate in the activities of ICOLC and identify themselves as participating consortia. Interested consortia, as they so choose, submit profiles for the ICOLC web site, join a common e-mail list, send representatives to meetings, participate in the meeting programs, and avail themselves of the common expertise of the organization.

History

Library cooperation in the United States has been around for more than a century, and a number of useful writings exist, documenting this type of cooperative activity and history. For example, since the 1930s, intentional, cooperative sharing of collections was pursued among the "Triangle" Universities in North Carolina (Duke University, North Carolina State University, and University of North Carolina, Chapel Hill).

Shared cataloging through OCLC and RLG brought libraries together in the 1960s and 1970s, while the 1980s saw movement to fast delivery for books and articles. A significant new impetus, however, came in the mid-1990s with the large-scale licensing of electronic resources, launched by publishers such as Encyclopædia Britannica and Academic Press. Explosive growth followed and with it awareness of a need for coordinating the work of consortia themselves.

The ICOLC began in 1996; by 2000 the then-Web site (hosted at Yale University Library [since migrated to a Lyrasis host]) recorded 135 member groups; and by fall 2011, 236 had contributed their profiles. In 2000, 2/3 member consortia were located in the US; by 2012, North American consortia represented only 60%, with member consortia from 44 other countries. In summer 2012, the ICOLC web site moved to its current location and members were asked to revise and re-contribute descriptions to the site. As of the end of April 2013, 150 (from 43 countries) had done so.

ICOLC's organization is entirely informal. It is not a legal organization, there are no dues, there are no elected officials, there are no bylaws, or other rules of engagement. Committees are established as necessary; there is some continuity in the meeting planning committees (both in North America and in Europe), and other task forces are established ad hoc to address specific statements or issues before the group. While the ICOLC leadership is entirely voluntary there are consortia and consortial staff that provide ongoing, continuous and long standing planning, support, and leadership. The ICOLC leadership is organic and evolutionary from within the community.

Consortia – contemporary activities

Consortia pursue many cooperative topics and host many projects, for example: resource sharing and inter-library lending; rationalizing and sharing print collections; building shared integrated library management systems; training; digitization programs; and advocacy, to name some.

Electronic resources licensing is one of today's high visibility consortial foci. Many factors motivate consortial licensing. For some, government support and funding for electronic access for students, citizens and researchers is a strong driver—often for groups of institutions as large as an entire nation's collection of libraries. In all cases, negotiating with multiple institutions at once can save publishers and information providers and libraries time and money. Also, significant benefits arise when a group working together discusses and analyzes terms of use that are found in provider licenses, where the goal on all sides is to maximize access while ensuring a financially stable publishing model.

The ICOLC actively supports and facilitates consortial content licensing, along with emerging possibilities for cross-consortial and cross-country arrangements.

References

External links
Main ICOLC web site

Library consortia
Organizations established in 1997
International nongovernmental organizations